The A. K. Smiley Public Library is a public library located at 125 W. Vine St. in Redlands, California. Built in 1898, the library was donated to Redlands by philanthropist Albert K. Smiley. Architect T.R. Griffith designed the library in a style which has alternately been described as Mission Revival and Moorish Revival and includes a variety of elements from additional styles. The building has a tile roof and parapets topping arcades on its sides, which suggest a Mission Revival influence; however, the battlement and the curves in the parapet are Moorish Revival elements. In addition, elements of the arches in the arcade, the windows, and the roof ridge were borrowed from classical, Gothic, Spanish Romanesque, and Oriental themens. The library still serves as the Redlands public library. In addition, it houses a collection of materials on native tribes in California donated by Andrew Carnegie, as well as a collection of rare materials about Southern California and local history.

The library was added to the National Register of Historic Places on December 12, 1976. It was designated a California Historical Landmark on August 17, 1990.

See also
California Historical Landmarks in San Bernardino County, California

References

External links

official A. K. Smiley Public Library website
Virtual tour

National Register of Historic Places in San Bernardino County, California
Libraries on the National Register of Historic Places in California
Library buildings completed in 1898
Buildings and structures in Redlands, California
Mission Revival architecture in California
Moorish Revival architecture in California
Education in San Bernardino County, California
Tourist attractions in San Bernardino County, California
Public libraries in California
History of Redlands, California
California Historical Landmarks